The governor of Samar is the local chief executive of the Philippine province of Samar (province).

References

Governors of Samar (province)
Governors of provinces of the Philippines